Lake Umatilla is a  long  reservoir on the Columbia River in the United States, between the U.S. states of Washington and Oregon. It was created in 1971 with the construction of John Day Dam, and stretches upstream to the McNary Dam. It lies in parts of Sherman, Gilliam, Morrow, and Umatilla counties in Oregon, and Klickitat and Benton counties in Washington.

See also
 List of lakes in Washington (state)
 List of lakes in Oregon
 List of hydroelectric dams on the Columbia River

References 

Columbia River Gorge
Reservoirs in Washington (state)
Reservoirs in Oregon
Bodies of water of Benton County, Washington
Lakes of Gilliam County, Oregon
Bodies of water of Klickitat County, Washington
Lakes of Morrow County, Oregon
Lakes of Sherman County, Oregon
Lakes of Umatilla County, Oregon
Protected areas of Gilliam County, Oregon
Protected areas of Morrow County, Oregon
Protected areas of Sherman County, Oregon
Protected areas of Umatilla County, Oregon
Protected areas of Benton County, Washington
Protected areas of Klickitat County, Washington
1971 establishments in Oregon
1971 establishments in Washington (state)